Mayavi is a 2007 Indian Malayalam-language action comedy film directed by Shafi and written by the Rafi Mecartin duo, starring Mammootty in the title role with Sai Kumar, Manoj K. Jayan, Salim Kumar, Suraj Venjaramoodu, Gopika, Vijayaraghavan and Santhosh Jogi in supporting roles. It was a commercial success and was remade in Tamil as Vallakottai in 2010, starring Arjun Sarja which was directed by A. Venkatesh.The film was a major commercial success and was the highest grossing movie of the year.

Plot

Small time criminal, Mahi gets released from prison early. He has a reputation of beating up his rivals in the darkness. Mahi wants to help fellow inmate Balan whose brother Satheesh  is in need of money for a life saving operation. A fellow crook, Giri proposes an assignment for Mahi which will earn him enough money for the operation. Thottappally Surendran plans to murder Sivasankaran to settle an old score. Sivasankaran is serving life sentence for killing Surendran's father and is due to be released on short term parole. As part of a master plot, Surendran wants another man to accept the criminal charge and punishment.

Mahi takes up the assignment and sets off to the island village along with Giri. During the boat service to the village, they meet Indu, the caretaker of Sivasankaran. During the trip, Indu gets harassed by Thottappally Sugunan, Surendran's brother. Mahi saves Indu with a single kick at Sugunan from the back which causes the boat to sink. Mahi saves the unconscious Indu from drowning and flees the scene immediately. On meeting Surendran, Mahi agrees to the task for Rs 8,00,000. Mahi and Giri are instructed to hang around the fishing village till Sivasankaran arrives on parole. Kannan Srank, a henchman of Surendran acts as their local contact.

On Surendran's instruction, Kannan Srank plots to defame Indu by accusing her of having an affair with Mahi. Indu loses her job at the harbour. Aaranaimuttom Devaki  saves Indu from further embarrassment. Mahi and Indu get to know each other. Mahi realises that Indu's younger sister Ammu is Sathessh's girlfriend. Sugunan tries to frame Ammu in a fraud charge. Mahi beats Sugunan up by covering Sugnan's face with Sugnan's mundu . He does the same with Surendran by mixing chilli powder and sand then throwing it at his face. Both of them do not get a clue who was the attacker.

The villagers speculate about a "Mayavi" (magician) behind the attack. Kannan Srank's bogus claims of knowing Mayavi add further fuel for the speculations. Mahi in pretense of Mayavi uses Kannan Srank to prove the innocence of both Ammu and Indu and exposes Thottappally brothers. Indu joins back the job at the harbour. Mahi through Kannan Srank also offers protection for Sivasankaran in exchange for medical expenses for Satheesh. Kannan Srank go further on behalf by plotting a story in which Mayavi is in love with Indu.

Sivasankaran arrives at the village knowing all about the plot to kill him. He commands Mahi and Giri to leave immediately. In the hospital meeting Satheesh, Sivasankaran mistakes Balan as Mayavi. Balan turns out to be a crook and he decides to play along even without knowing the entire story. Indu refuses to believe that Balan is Mayavi. Yatheendran, another convict identifies Mahi as Mayavi and Thottappally brothers entrusts Yatheendran to kill Mahi. Mahi beats up Yatheendran and  Thottappally brothers and spoils the plot to kill Sivasankaran. Sivasankaran, however still believes Balan is Mayavi and decides to fix Indu's wedding with Balan and make Balan a partner in his businesses. Mahi tries to stop Balan from his activities which make him furious and turns againest him. How Mahi makes Sivasankaran believe the truth remains in the rest of the story.

Cast

 Mammootty as  Mahi aka Mayavi
 Manoj K. Jayan as  Balan
 Sai Kumar as  Aaranimuttom Sivasankaran Pillai
 Salim Kumar as  Kannan Srank
 Suraj Venjaramoodu as Giri
 Gopika as Indu
 Vijayaraghavan as  Thottappally Surendran
 Santhosh Jogi as Thottappally Sugunan
 Spadikam George as Police Officer
 Mohan Raj as  Yatheendran
 P. Sreekumar as  Advocate
 Cochin Haneefa as  Jailor
 K. P. A. C. Lalitha as  Aaranimuttom Devaki
Tony Sigimon as Sivasankaran’s son
 Mamukkoya as Koya
 Manikuttan as  Satheesh
 Narayanankutty as Sasi
 Bindu Panicker as Thottappally Surendran's Wife
 T. P. Madhavan as Home Minister
 Nimisha Suresh as Ammu (Indu's Sister)
 Vishnu Unnikrishnan
 Kalabhavan Rahman as Kumaran

Soundtrack

The songs are composed by Alex Paul. The soundtrack album, which was released on 2007, features four songs overall, with lyrics written by Vayalar Sharath Chandra Varma.

Reception
The film was commercial success. The film collected 2.21 crore in its first week from 45 screens in Kerala. At Thiruvananthapuram Ajantha and Sri, it grossed nearly ₹11 lakhs in its first week. The film collected ₹11 crore within 50 days of its release and a distributor share of more than 6 crores in 50 days. It became the first Malayalam film of 2007 to run for 100 days in theatres, grossing 15 crore. In 100 days, the film had collected ₹61 lakhs from main centers like Trivandrum. It was the highest grossing Malayalam film of the year 2007.

References

External links 
 

2000s Malayalam-language films
2007 films
2007 action films
Malayalam films remade in other languages
Films shot in Kochi
Films directed by Shafi
Indian action comedy films